Christopher James Adams (6 September 1927 – 24 June 2012) was an English footballer whose position was outside left.

Playing career
Adams started his career playing for various local teams in Essex before joining Leytonstone.

He signed for Tottenham Hotspur as an apprentice in 1947, before turning professional the following year and playing in the top division of English football. After four years at Spurs he made a total of just six appearances. Although his solitary goal came on his debut in a win 5–0 victory over Derby County at White Hart Lane in March 1952.

Adams signed for Norwich in 1952 and went on to feature in 29 matches and found the net on three occasions.

His last professional club was Watford, whom he played for from 1954 until 1956 and making a further 75 appearances and netting five goals, when he was granted a free transfer by the Football League.

Adams ended his playing career with Southern Football League side Dartford where he netted 21 goals in 216 appearances before retiring in 1964.

Adams died on 24 June 2012 at the age of 84.

References

External links 

English Football League players
1927 births
Footballers from Hornchurch
2012 deaths
Tottenham Hotspur F.C. players
Norwich City F.C. players
Watford F.C. players
Dartford F.C. players
English footballers
Association football outside forwards